Uraloclymenia is an extinct ammonoid cephalopod genus from the Late Devonian, Famennian stage. The type species is Uraloclymenia volkovi Bogoslovskii, 1977

The shell of Uranloclymenia is lenticular, with a narrow umbilicus and usually free of ribs. Constrictions are absent. The suture has a very broad, shallow ventral lobe, a shallowly rounded lateral lobe, an inconspicuous umbilical lobe inside the umbilical seam, and an internal lobe on the dorsum. As for all clymeniids, the siphuncle is along the dorsum.

References
 Taxonomy, Goniat online 8/21/2010
Paleobiology Database-Uraloclymenia 8/21/2010
W. B. Saunders, D. M. Work, S. V. Nikolaeva (1999). "Evolution of complexity in Paleozoic ammonoid sutures". Science 286 (5440): 760–763.

Ammonite genera
Late Devonian ammonites
Cyrtoclymeniina